The 2000 Towson Tigers football team was an American football team that represented Towson University during the 2000 NCAA Division I-AA football season. Towson tied for last in the Patriot League.

In their ninth year under head coach Gordy Combs, the Tigers compiled a 7–4 record. 

The Tigers outscored opponents 299 to 216. Their 3–3 conference record placed fourth in the seven-team Patriot League standings. 

Towson played its home games at Minnegan Stadium on the university campus in Towson, Maryland.

Schedule

References

Towson
Towson Tigers football seasons
Towson Tigers football